Friday Island is an island in the River Thames in England at Old Windsor, Berkshire. It is on the reach above Bell Weir Lock, just short of Old Windsor Lock.

Secluded
The small island, whose shape is said to resemble the footprint of Man Friday in Daniel Defoe's 1719 novel Robinson Crusoe, contains a two-bedroom cottage with a well, almost hidden by willow trees. For thirty years this was the home of Dr Julius Grant, the forensic scientist, from 1966 until his death in 1991. He was noted, among other detection, for proving in 1984 that the Hitler Diaries published in the Sunday Times were forgeries, despite an endorsement of their authenticity from the historian Hugh Trevor-Roper. The lock keeper recalled Dr Grant saying that when he went to the island, he felt it was like going a million miles away. It was like owning half of Australia, it was so secluded.

See also
Islands in the River Thames

References

Islands of the River Thames